Odiliapeel (Brabantian: De Piejel) is a village in the Netherlands. It is situated in the northeast corner of the province of North Brabant, south of Volkel Air Base. It used to be part of  the municipality of Uden, but merged into the municipality of Maashorst in 2022.

Odiliapeel was founded in 1921 as a heath excavation settlement. On 5 May 1930, it was officially named Odiliapeel, and is a combination of Odile of Alsace and the region Peel. The initial excavation of the area started in 1908, however a government subsidy plan led to the systematic exploration of the area. The village was designed by Heidemij (nowadays: Arcadis).

The Catholic Kruisvindingskerk was built between 1958 and 1959 as an aisleless church and a massive tower attached to the side of the church.

Gallery

References

External links 
 Official site (in Dutch)

Populated places in North Brabant
Geography of Maashorst
1921 establishments in the Netherlands